Susan Miller (or similar) may refer to:

Writers
Susanne Miller (1915–2008), Bulgarian-British-German left wing activist and historian
Sue Miller (cancer activist) (1934–2017), American model and author
Sue Miller (born 1943), American novelist and short story writer
Susan Miller (playwright) (born 1944), American Guggenheim Fellow and Obie winner
Susan Cummins Miller (born 1949), American author of mystery novels
Suzie Miller, Australian human rights lawyer and, since 2002, playwright 
Susan A. Miller (born 1978), American Indian historian

Performers
Susan Jane Miller (born 1946), American film and TV actress; stage name Susan Saint James 
Susan Miller (born 1947), American model and actress (List of Playboy Playmates of 1972#September)
Suzy Miller (born 1949), British model, actress, dancer and choreographer during 1960 and 1970s
Susie Miller, Israeli singer, founding member of 1971–1983 pop-folk group The Brothers & the Sisters
Susana Miller, Argentine tango dancer and teacher since late 1980s

Others
Susan Miller, Baroness Miller of Chilthorne Domer (born 1954), English politician, member of House of Lords
Susan Miller (astrologer), American astrologer
Susan Miller (producer), American television, film, digital media, book and licensing executive starting in 1980s
Susan Barse Miller, American painter
Suzanne Miller, Canadian curler in 2012 Moosehead Fall Open#Women

Fictional characters
Sue Miller, adoptive mother on British TV soap opera EastEnders (List of EastEnders characters (2001)#Sue Miller)